Michael Copeland is a Canadian business, sports executive and former president and CEO of the Toronto Argonauts. From 2013 to 2015 he was the president and COO of the Canadian Football League.

Biography

University and business
In 1993, he graduated from the University of Western Ontario in London, Ontario. In 1999, he went on to get an MBA from the university's Ivey Business School. He went on to work in a variety of law and consulting companies such as practicing corporate and commercial law with Blake, Cassels & Graydon in Toronto and Harrison, Elwood in London, Ontario, as well as becoming a Senior Consultant at Deloitte Consulting in Sydney Australia, and then going on to work for three years with the Boston Consulting Group. After working with Boston Consulting, he went into business development and marketing at the Molson Coors Brewing Company.

Canadian Football League
In January 2006, he became the chief operating officer of the Canadian Football League. In February 2013, he became President and COO of the league.

In May 2015, the Toronto Argonauts were bought by Kilmer Sports and Bell Canada from David Braley. On 13 July 2015, it was announced that Copeland would become president and CEO of the Argonauts at the beginning of 2016. He replaced Chris Rudge who had served in that role since 2012. In 2018, Copeland was replaced as president by new owners Maple Leaf Sports & Entertainment with Bill Manning.

See also
 Toronto Argonauts

References

Living people
University of Western Ontario alumni
Toronto Argonauts team presidents
Canadian Football League executives
Chief operating officers
Year of birth missing (living people)